Progomphus is a genus of medium-sized dragonflies in the family Gomphidae. They are found in the Americas and are largely tropical. They are one of the few Gomphids with coloured wings.

They are commonly called sanddragons. They are usually found on freshwater sandy beaches and pools.

The genus contains the following species:

References

 Dunkle, S.W., Dragonflies through Binoculars. Toronto:Oxford University Press, 2000.
 Progomphus, The Odonata - Dragonflies and Damselflies
 Progomphus, BugGuide

Gomphidae
Anisoptera genera
Taxa named by Edmond de Sélys Longchamps
Taxonomy articles created by Polbot